Secusio deilemera is a moth in the  subfamily Arctiinae. It was described by Strand in 1909. It is found in Angola, the Democratic Republic of Congo, South Africa and Uganda.

References

Natural History Museum Lepidoptera generic names catalog

Moths described in 1909
Arctiini